Reminiscences of a Stock Operator is a 1923 roman à clef by American author Edwin Lefèvre. It is told in the first person by a character inspired by the life of stock trader Jesse Livermore up to that point.

The book remains in print. In December 2009, Wiley published an annotated edition in hardcover, that bridges the gap between Lefèvre's fictionalized account and the actual people and places referred to in the book. It also includes a foreword by hedge fund manager Paul Tudor Jones.

Plot
The book can be divided into three parts:
 1890-1910: Livermore was able to make easy money by taking advantage of the bid–ask spread on inactive stocks with leverage of 100-to-1 at bucket shops. 
 1910-1920: Livermore was a stock trader on the New York Stock Exchange, where he went boom and bust several times using high leverage.
 1920s: Livermore engaged in market manipulation which was not illegal or without precedent then, charging fees of 25% of the market value of the manipulated stock. This was before the creation of the U.S. Securities and Exchange Commission in 1934.

Accolades
In his 2008 book, The Age of Turbulence, Alan Greenspan called the book "a font of investing wisdom" and noted that quotes from the book such as "bulls and bears make money; pigs get slaughtered" are now adages.

A March 2005 article in Fortune listed it among "The Smartest Books We Know" about business.

In Market Wizards by Jack D. Schwager, many investors, including Richard Dennis, quoted the book as a major source of material on stock trading.

References

External links
 
 Reminiscences of a Stock Operator (Annotated Edition): with the Livermore Market Key and Commentary Included, 2020 printing/paperback, Print on Demand 
1923 books
Business books
Novels about traders
Wiley (publisher) books